John Butcher (born July 3, 1991) is a former professional Australian rules footballer who played for the Port Adelaide Football Club in the Australian Football League (AFL). He was the earliest of the three Port Adelaide players drafted in the first round of the 2009 AFL Draft (he went at pick 8). Butcher's younger brother, Danny, was drafted to Port Adelaide as part of the 2011 Rookie Draft at pick 21.

Professional career 

Originally from Maffra, Victoria, Butcher is a versatile key position prospect with great agility and pace for his size. Butcher is an excellent contested mark and has been noted for his "clean hands." He was extremely impressive at the AFL Draft Camp, with his speed (2.99 sec over 20 m) and repeat sprints (24.88 sec) being in the top 28 percent of all players. He kicked 40 goals for the year for Gippsland Power and Vic Country in 16 games. He was a Vic Country Under-18 representative in both 2008 and 2009, including kicking three goals against Vic Metro in 2009. Butcher is also an AIS-AFL Academy graduate. He was widely tipped to be the first key position player to be selected in the 2009 draft.

To date, it remains the worst defeat suffered by any player in his debut match in VFL/AFL history. In his second match against the  he kicked six straight goals from six disposals. However, following Butcher's promising debut season, which saw him nicknamed "The Future" by supporters, Butcher has since struggled to establish himself as an AFL player.

Butcher played the first three games of the 2014 season for an underwhelming return of two goals before being returned to the South Australian National Football League (SANFL), where he played out the remainder of the season. He finished the season as the leading goal kicker for the Magpies with 32 goals.

Butcher's 2015 season start was also a struggle, as he'd managed only indifferent form in the SANFL, had played just one AFL match in Round 1 and looked odds on to be delisted at the end of the season. However, with Jay Schulz being a late exclusion in Round 20, Butcher came in against Greater Western Sydney and played the final four matches of the AFL season. Butcher's marking in the final two matches of the season was sublime, gathering 6 contested marks and 7 marks inside the 50 against Gold Coast and Fremantle. His end-of-season form was rewarded with a one-year contract offer for 2016. He was delisted at the conclusion of the 2016 season and subsequently signed to play football for Central Districts Football Club in the SANFL in 2017. Butcher and his brother Danny joined Northern Territory Football League (NTFL) club Nightcliff, playing in their 2018 premiership team, and then in the same year helped his home town of Maffra win their 9th premiership in 18 years. John now goes by the nickname "The Bad Boy" after dropping "The Future."

References

External links

Living people
1991 births
Australian rules footballers from Victoria (Australia)
Central District Football Club players
Gippsland Power players
Port Adelaide Football Club players
Port Adelaide Football Club players (all competitions)
Maffra Football Club players
People from Maffra
Nightcliff Football Club players